Mary Livermore (born Mary Ashton Rice; December 19, 1820May 23, 1905) was an American journalist, abolitionist, and advocate of women's rights. Her printed volumes included: Thirty Years Too Late, first published in 1847 as a prize temperance tale, and republished in 1878; Pen Pictures; or, Sketches from Domestic Life; What Shall We Do with Our Daughters? Superfluous Women, and Other Lectures; and My Story of the War. A Woman's Narrative of Four Years' Personal Experience as Nurse in the Union Army, and in Relief Work at Home, in Hospitals, Camps and at the Front during the War of the Rebellion. For Women of the Day, she wrote the sketch of the sculptress, Miss Anne Whitney; and for the Centennial Celebration of the First Settlement of the Northwestern States, at Marietta, Ohio, July 15, 1788, she delivered the historical address.

When the American Civil War broke out, she became connected with the United States Sanitary Commission, headquarters at Chicago, performing a vast amount of labor of all kinds—organizing auxiliary societies, visiting hospitals and military posts, contributing to the press, answering correspondence, and other things incident to the work done by that institution. She was one of those that helped organize the great fair in 1863, at Chicago, when nearly US$100,000 was raised, and for which she obtained the original draft of the Emancipation Proclamation from President Lincoln, which was sold for $3,000, and funded the building of the Soldiers' Home. When the war was over, she instituted a pro-women's suffrage paper called the Agitator, which was afterwards merged in the Woman's Journal. Of this, she was editor for two years and a frequent contributor thereafter. On the lecture platform, she had a remarkable career, speaking mostly in behalf of women's suffrage and the temperance movements. Many years, she traveled  annually, speaking five nights each week for five months of the year.

Early years and education
Mary Ashton Rice was born in Boston, Massachusetts on December 19, 1820, to Timothy Rice and Zebiah Vose (Ashton) Rice. She was a direct descendant of Edmund Rice, an early Puritan immigrant to Massachusetts Bay Colony.  Livermore came from a military family: her father fought in the War of 1812 and her mother was a descendant of Captain Nathaniel Ashton of London. Livermore was incredibly intelligent, graduating from Boston public schools at age 14. Because there were no public high school or college options for women of that time, she attended school at an all-female seminary in Charlestown, Massachusetts, graduating in 1838. As her family was extremely religious, she read the entire Bible every year until the age of 23.

Career
After graduating from the seminary in 1836, she stayed there as a teacher for two years. In 1839, she started a job as a tutor on a Virginia plantation, and after witnessing the cruel institution of slavery, she became an abolitionist. She also began work with the temperance movement at this time, identified with the Washington Temperance Reform and an editor for a juvenile temperance paper. In 1842, she left the plantation to take charge of a private school in Duxbury, Massachusetts, where she worked for three years. She also taught at Charlestown, Massachusetts.

She married Daniel P. Livermore, a Universalist minister in May 1845, and in 1857, they moved to Chicago. In that year, her husband established the New Covenant, a Universalist journal of which she became associate editor for twelve years, during which time she frequently contributed to periodicals of her denomination and edited the Lily.

As a member of the Republican party, Livermore campaigned for Abraham Lincoln in the 1860 presidential election. In the Chicago Wigwam in 1860, Livermore was the only woman reporter assigned a location for work amidst over hundreds of male reporters. She published a collection of nineteen essays entitled Pen Pictures in 1863.

American Civil War
During the Civil War, she volunteered as an associate member of the United States Sanitary Commission at 40 years old.  As agent of its Chicago branch, later named the Northwestern branch, she attended a council of the National Sanitary Commission at Washington in December 1862, organized many aid societies, visited army posts and hospitals, and in 1863, organized the North-western Sanitary Fair in Chicago which raised $86,000.  President Lincoln donated his own copy of the Emancipation Proclamation, which was auctioned off at $10,000. Livermore eventually became the co-director of the Chicago branch with Jane Hoge, another soldier's aid advocate. The two women completed a hospital inspection tour across Illinois, Kentucky, and Missouri. With a thorough understanding of the needs of the hospitals, Hoge and Livermore sent $1 million worth of food and supplies to hospitals and battlefields most in need.

Livermore, like many other nurses, came up against the issue of women disguised as male soldiers. On a visit to the camp of the 19th Illinois Infantry, a captain pointed out a soldier to Livermore, asking if she noticed anything odd about them. Livermore confirmed the captain's suspicions that the soldier was indeed a woman. The captain called the soldier for questioning, and though she pleaded to stay in service near her beloved, Livermore escorted her out of camp. The soldier escaped Livermore, however, and fled.

In addition to her nursing services, Livermore was also a prolific writer. She authored numerous books of poetry, essays, and stories, and was a recognized member of the literary guild. Though Livermore had to sacrifice much of her social justice work for nursing, she still managed to publish some kind of content once a week throughout the entirety of the war.  She summarized her experience in her 1887 book, My Story of the War. A Woman's Narrative of Four Years' Personal Experience as Nurse in the Union Army, and in Relief Work at Home, in Hospitals, Camps and at the Front during the War of the Rebellion.

Suffrage and temperance activities

After the war, Livermore devoted herself to the promotion of women's suffrage (along with Lucy Stone and Julia Ward Howe ) and the temperance movement.  In 1868, she co-founded the Chicago Sorosis Club with Myra Bradwell and Kate Doggett. This was the first women's group in Chicago to advocate for woman suffrage. That same year, the group organized the first woman suffrage convention in Chicago.

In 1869, the year that women suffragists in the Equal Rights Association spilt over the issue of voting rights for African American men, Livermore sided with Lucy Stone and those founding the American Woman Suffrage Association.  That same year, she founded and edited a suffragist journal called The Agitator, which was "devoted to the interests of women."  She published 37 issues of the journal that year.  In 1870, the Livermores moved to Boston, and Mary began to be active in suffrage activities there. The Agitator was merged into the Woman's Journal, the well-known suffrage journal founded by Lucy Stone, and Livermore became associate editor. She served in that role for two years.

Joining with Stone, Henry Blackwell and Julia Ward Howe, Livermore helped found the Massachusetts Women's Suffrage Association. She became president of the American Woman Suffrage Association.  She was also the first president of the Association for the Advancement of Women.

Spiritualism
Livermore was interested in spiritualism, which grew in popularity after the Civil War, especially among Unitarians. After her husband died in 1899, she believed she was able to continue to communicate with him through a medium.

Death and legacy
Livermore died in Melrose, Massachusetts on May 23, 1905.

The Mary A. Livermore School in Melrose, operational from 1891 to 1933, was an elementary school named for Livermore. In 1943, nearly four decades after her death, she became the namesake of a World War II Liberty ship, the SS Mary A. Livermore.

Selected works

 The Children's Army (1844), temperance stories.
 "The Twin Sisters: or, The History of Two Families," collected in The Two Families; and The Duty that Lies Nearest. Prize Stories (1848), a temperance story.
 A Mental Transformation (1848).
 Nineteen Pen Pictures (1863), short stories.
 What Shall We Do With Our Daughters? and Other Lectures
 A Woman of the Century (1893) (ed. Willard, Frances E. & Livermore, Mary A.) – online available in  Wikisource.
 My Story of the War: The Civil War Memories of the Famous Nurse, Relief Organizer and Suffragette (1887/1995) with Introduction by Nina Silber. New York: Da Capo Press .
 The story of my life; or, The sunshine and shadow of seventy years (1897).
 Cooperative Womanhood in the State (1891). North American Review 153:4, pp. 283–295.

See also

List of suffragists and suffragettes
List of women's rights activists
Timeline of women's suffrage

References

Bibliography

Further reading
 Venet, Wendy Hamand. A Strong-Minded Woman: The Life of Mary Livermore. Amherst: University of Massachusetts Press, 2005. .

 Ruegamer, Lana. "Livermore, Mary Ashton Rice." In Women Building Chicago, 1790-1990: A Biographical Dictionary, edited by Rima Lunin Schultz and Adele Hast. Bloomington: Indiana University Press, 2001.
 Schnell, Christopher J. "Mary Livermore and the Great Northwestern Fair." Chicago History 4, no. 1 (1975): 34–43.
 Patricia M. Shields. 2004. Mary Livermore A Legacy of Caring and Cooperative Womanhood in Outstanding Women in Public Administration: Leaders, Mentors and Pioneers. Edited by Claire Felbinger and Wendy Haynes. pp. 49–64. New York: ME Sharpe.

External links

 
Article at PBS
Entry  at the Dictionary of Unitarian & Universalist Biography

Carrie Chapman Catt Collection at the Library of Congress has volumes from the library of Mary A. Livermore.
A Spartacus Educational Biography
Online copy of "My Story of the War" 

1820 births
1905 deaths
American suffragists
People of Illinois in the American Civil War
People of Massachusetts in the American Civil War
Writers from Chicago
United States Sanitary Commission people
Members of the Universalist Church of America
19th-century Christian universalists
20th-century Christian universalists
American Civil War medicine
Illinois Republicans
American temperance activists
19th-century American writers
19th-century American women writers
People from Boston
People from Melrose, Massachusetts
American Civil War nurses
American women nurses
Wikipedia articles incorporating text from A Woman of the Century